Chazel is a municipality in northwestern Quebec, Canada, in the Abitibi-Ouest Regional County Municipality. It had a population of 254 in the 2021 Canadian Census.

The municipality was incorporated on February 19, 1938, as the Municipality of Saint-Janvier, and commonly known as Saint-Janvier-de-Chazel. In 1991, it was renamed to Chazel, named after Guillaume Chazel, a French soldier who died in 1725 near Cape Breton.

Demographics

Population

Language

Municipal council
 Mayor: Daniel Favreau
 Councillors:  Nancy Bureau, Anne Breton, René Frappier, Armande Bouchard, Hélène Lévesque-Charrois, Yves Frappier

Political representation 

Provincially it is part of the riding of Abitibi-Ouest. In the 2022 Quebec general election the incumbent MNA Suzanne Blais, of the Coalition Avenir Québec, was re-elected to represent the population of Chazel in the National Assembly of Quebec.

Federally, Chazel is part of the federal riding of Abitibi—Témiscamingue. In the 2021 Canadian federal election, the incumbent Sébastien Lemire of the Bloc Québécois was re-elected to represent the population Chazel in the House of Commons of Canada.

Historical publications
Saint-Janvier-de-Chazel – Histoire et généalogie et occupation du territoire, published by "Société d'histoire et de généalogie de Val-d'Or", Gisèle Chamberland, 2004, 315 pages.

See also
 List of municipalities in Quebec

References

Municipalities in Quebec
Incorporated places in Abitibi-Témiscamingue
Populated places established in 1917